Kennedy Rashod Meeks (born February 5, 1995) is an American professional basketball player who last played for Cholet Basket of the LNB Pro A. He played college basketball for North Carolina. He is a native of Charlotte, North Carolina.

High school career
Meeks attended West Charlotte High School, where he averaged 19 points, 16 rebounds, and 3 blocks as a senior. He was named to the McDonald's All-America team in 2013.

College career

Freshman season (2013–14)
As a freshman, Meeks averaged 7.6 points and 6.1 rebounds in 16.3 minutes per game and was named to the ACC All-Freshman team. He worked with North Carolina strength and conditioning coach Jonas Sahratian to slim down in the offseason.

Sophomore season (2014–15)
As a sophomore, Meeks was named an honorable mention All-ACC performer. He sprained his left knee in the Tar Heels' Round of 32 NCAA Tournament victory over Arkansas. At the time, he was averaging 11.6 points, second behind Marcus Paige and he led the team in rebounds with 7.4 rebounds in 23.6 minutes per game. He was in the midst of a scoring slump before the injury, scoring more than 10 points only once in the last eight games.

Junior season (2015–16)
As a junior, Meeks scored a career high 25 points against Temple University. On January 16, 2016, Meeks scored 23 points and 6 rebounds in a 67-55 victory against NC State. He injured his left knee and was out for two weeks mid-season. 
He returned and helped lead UNC to the National Championship game, where they lost to a buzzer beater by Villanova's Kris Jenkins.

Senior season (2016–17) 
In his senior season, he helped the Tar Heels reach a second consecutive NCAA championship game, and he grabbed 10 rebounds to help his team beat the Gonzaga Bulldogs 71–65. Meeks registered a strong run of performances at the end of the season, breaking Tyler Hansbrough's school record for the most rebounds in an NCAA tournament.

College statistics

|-
| style="text-align:left;"| 2013–14
| style="text-align:left;"| North Carolina
| 34 || 17 || 16.3 || .548 || - || .586 || 6.1 || .8 || .3 || .8 || 7.6
|-
| style="text-align:left;"| 2014–15
| style="text-align:left;"| North Carolina
| 37 || 32 || 23.3 || .562 || .000 || .641 || 7.3 || 1.1 || .6 || 1.2 || 11.4
|-
| style="text-align:left;"| 2015–16
| style="text-align:left;"| North Carolina
| 33 || 28 || 20.6 || .563 || – || .708 || 5.9 || 1 || .8 || 1 || 9.8
|-
| style="text-align:left;"| 2016–17
| style="text-align:left;"| North Carolina
| 40 || 40 || 24.3 || .555 || – || .622 || 9.5 || 1 || 1 || 1.2 || 12.5
|- class="sortbottom"
| style="text-align:center;" colspan="2"| Career
| 144 || 117 || 21.3 || .557 || .000 || .634 || 7.3 || 1 || .7 || 1.1 || 10.4

Professional career

Raptors 905 (2017–2018)
After going undrafted in the 2017 NBA draft, Meeks was signed by the Toronto Raptors for their Summer League team and for training camp. He was waived by the Raptors on October 7, 2017. As an affiliate player, he was picked up by the Raptors 905.

SeaHorses Mikawa (2018–2019)
On November 24, 2018, Kennedy Meeks signed with the SeaHorses Mikawa of the Japanese B.League.

Levanga Hokkaido (2019–2020)
On June 30, 2019, Meeks signed with the Charlotte Hornets for the Summer League.

On September 26, 2019, Meeks signed with Levanga Hokkaido of the Japanese B.League.

Seoul Samsung Thunders (2020–2021)
On December 20, 2020, Meeks signed with the Seoul Samsung Thunders of the South Korean KBL to reunite with former Tar Heel teammate Isaiah Hicks.

Cholet Basket (2021–2022)
On September 29, 2021, Meeks signed with Cholet Basket of the LNB Pro A.

Career statistics

|-
| align=center | 2017–18
| align=left | Raptors 905 
| NBA G League
| 45 || 27.7 || .505 || .056 || .761 || 9.5 || 1.6 || 1.0 || 1.0 || 12.9
|-
| align=center | 2018–19
| align=left | Aishin Sea Horses 
| B.League
| 37 || 32.0 || .493 || .222 || .695 || 11.0 || 5.2 || 1.0 || 1.1 || 14.7
|-
| align=center | 2019–20
| align=left | Levanga Hokkaido 
| B.League
| 31 || 34.1 || .514 || .364 || .825 || 11.0 || 2.7 || 1.2 || 1.2 || 21.0
|-
| align=center | 2020–21
| align=left | Seoul Samsung Thunders 
| KBL
| 8 || 17.6 || .429 || .000 || .500 || 7.6 || .9 || .6 || .1 || 8.6
|-
| align=center | 2021-22
| style="text-align:left;"|Cholet Basket
| LNB Pro A
| 25 || 15.5 || .463 || .318 || .818 || 3.6 || .8 || .6 || .3 || 7.4

Playoff statistics

|-
| style="text-align:left;"|2018
| style="text-align:left;"|Raptors 905
| 5 || 5 || 25.3 || .488 || .250 || .727 || 9.4 || .8 || .8 || .4 || 9.8
|- class="sortbottom"
| style="text-align:center;" colspan="2"| Career
| 5 || 5 || 25.3 || .488 || .250 || .727 || 9.4 || .8 || .8 || .4 || 9.8

References

External links

North Carolina Tar Heels bio

1995 births
Living people
21st-century African-American sportspeople
African-American basketball players
American expatriate basketball people in Canada
American expatriate basketball people in France
American expatriate basketball people in Japan
American men's basketball players
Basketball players from Charlotte, North Carolina
Centers (basketball)
Cholet Basket players
Levanga Hokkaido players
McDonald's High School All-Americans
North Carolina Tar Heels men's basketball players
Power forwards (basketball)
Raptors 905 players
SeaHorses Mikawa players
United States men's national basketball team players